Trench & Snook was an architecture firm in New York City in the mid-19th century which was a partnership of Joseph Trench, the senior partner, and John B. Snook, the junior partner.  It evolved out of Joseph Trench & Company around the mid-1840s, several years after Snook joined the firm.  After Trench left in 1850 or 1851, Snook practiced on his own under the company name.  It later became John B. Snook & Sons after three of his sons and a son-in-law joined the firm.

See also
Joseph Trench
John B. Snook

References
Notes

External links

19th-century American architects
Architecture firms of the United States